Pugal Sillathur is a village in the Orathanadu taluk of Thanjavur district, Tamil Nadu, India.

Demographics 

As per the 2001 census, Pugal Sillathur had a total population of 598 with 304 males and 294 females. The sex ratio was 967. The literacy rate was 36.26.

References 

 

Villages in Thanjavur district